Paraskevas is a Greek name, see:

 Paraskevas (given name)
 Paraskevas (surname)